White heron may refer to:

Great egret, (Ardea alba), also known as the great white egret, common egret or white heron
Eastern great egret (Ardea alba modesta)
"A White Heron", a short story by Sarah Orne Jewett